Kim Kwang-kyu (born December 8, 1967) is a South Korean actor. He made his acting debut in 1999 in Dr. K, and its director fellow Busan native Kwak Kyung-taek later cast him in a small but memorable role as a physically abusive teacher in the 2001 box-office hit Friend. Kim continued acting in both television and film as a supporting actor, notably in Couple or Trouble (2006), The Secret of Coocoo Island (2008), Scent of a Woman (2011), and I Can Hear Your Voice (2013). He also appears on the reality shows I Live Alone (since 2013) and Three Meals a Day (2015).

Filmography

Film

Television series

Web series

Television  show

Discography

Awards and nominations

References

External links
 
 
 
 
 

1967 births
Living people
People from Busan
Male actors from Busan
20th-century South Korean male actors
21st-century South Korean male actors
South Korean male television actors
South Korean male film actors
Republic of Korea Army personnel
South Korean Buddhists